The North East Premier League is the top level of competition for recreational club cricket in the North East, serving the historic counties of Durham and Northumberland. Since 2000 it has been a designated ECB Premier League. In 2013, the league expanded into two divisions (Premier and Division 1) following a restructure of the cricketing leagues in the North East of England. Subsequently, the Durham & Northeast Cricket League and Northumberland and Tyneside Cricket League began to feed into the NEPL in the revised pyramid structure for the purposes of promotion and relegation.

The 2020 competition was cancelled because of the COVID-19 pandemic. A replacement competition was organised for the later part of the season when cricket again became possible, but with the winners not to be regarded as official league champions.

The most successful team has been South Northumberland who have been champions on thirteen occasions in the league's twenty one year history, including six consecutive championships between 2003 and 2008.

Champions

Division 1

Performance by season from 2000

Division One

References

External links
 Official website
 play-cricket website

English domestic cricket competitions
Cricket in County Durham
Cricket in Northumberland
Cricket in Tyne and Wear
ECB Premier Leagues